The ouzini is a mixed alcoholic cocktail invented by the novelist Michael Paraskos as an alternative national drink of Cyprus to the ubiquitous brandy sour.

Using only native Cypriot ingredients, including Cypriot ouzo, the drink was invented in response to a campaign launched in 2014 by the Cyprus Tourism Organisation to encourage restaurants in Cyprus to offer customers Cypriot cuisine. According to Paraskos the drink tastes "like liquid aniseed balls", referring to the traditional boiled sweet, and is "ideal for a hot Cypriot evening before dinner."

The drink is featured heavily in Michael Paraskos's novel In Search of Sixpence.

See also
 List of cocktails

References

Further reading
 

Cocktails with ouzo
Cypriot cuisine
Cocktails with bitters
Cocktails